T. neglecta may refer to:
 Tapura neglecta, a plant species endemic to Gabon
 Tarentola neglecta, the Algerian wall gecko, a lizard species found in Algeria and Tunisia
 Templetonia neglecta, a  flowering plant species in the genus Templetonia
 Tetratheca neglecta, Joy Thomps., a plant species in the genus Tetratheca endemic to Australia
 Tillandsia neglecta, a plant species endemic to Brazil

See also
 Neglecta (disambiguation)